This article details the discography of Petra. Petra is a music group formed in 1972, and regarded as a pioneer of the Christian rock and contemporary Christian music genres. Though they disbanded formally in 2005, incarnations of Petra have played reunion shows in the years since and released an album in fall 2010. The band released 24 albums (including two live albums, and two Spanish albums) during their 33 years of career starting with their first release in 1974 and finishing with their last album in 2005.

Full discography

Unreleased songs
Petra recorded several songs for multi-artist compilation albums that are not available on any of the band's own albums. The band also has songs that were performed only in concert or never recorded for an album.
 "Rocking On with Jesus" (played in concert in the 1970s, never recorded)

This song has recently been recorded by the band GHF (God Has Forgiven) on their album Honestly Live. GHF consists of the original Petra lineup minus Bob Hartman: Greg Hough on guitars and vocals, Bill Glover on drums and vocals, and John DeGroff on bass and vocals.

GHF also played two "reunion" shows with Bob Hartman during Petra's farewell tour.

 "Onward Christian Soldiers" (featured on the album Our Hymns, 1989, later included on the two-CD/Cassette 1996 Spring Arbor Release Hymns: 26 All Time Classics , and finally incorporated on the PETRA compilation album Still Means War (2002) )
 "Who Do You Listen To?" (featured on the video Who Do You Listen To? Music Video Soundtrack, 1989, later included on the CD Songs for a Small Circle of Friends, 1991)
 "Our Turn Now" (featured on Carman's album Addicted To Jesus, 1991)
 "I Don't Want To Fall Away From You" (featured on the album No Compromise: Remembering The Music of Keith Green, 1992)
 "It's a New Day" (written for Jekyll & Hyde, 2003, unreleased)

Videos
 Captured In Time & Space (1986, Starsong)
 On Fire! Video Event (1989, Word)
 Beyond Belief Video Album (Mini Movie) (1990, Word)
 Backstage Pass (1992, Word)
 Wake-Up Call Video Collection (1993, Word)
 Revival Inpop (November 20, 2001, Inpop Records)
 Farewell (March 7, 2006, Inpop Records)
 Captured in Time & Space DVD (2006, exclusively licensed to Petra Productions, Inc.)   
 Back to the Rock Live DVD (July 8, 2011, independent / September 20, 2011, P-ID Blue)

Compilation albums
There are several official and unofficial compilation albums of Petra. These are the official ones. In addition to this list, there are youth choir collections (sheet music for use by churches) which include studio recordings of professional singers and musicians performing those versions.

 Petra Means Rock (1989, Star Song Records)
 War & Remembrance (2CD/CS with booklet, 1990, Star Song Records)
 Petrafied: The Best Of Petra (1991, Star Song Records)
 Petraphonics (1992, Star Song Records)
 Power Praise (1994, Star Song Records), not to be confused with either Petra Praise album on Word Records—this album contained songs that simply contained a praise theme.
 Rock Block (1995, Star Song Records)
 The Early Years (1996, Star Song Records)
 The Coloring Song (1999, EMI/Capitol – same track list as The Early Years)
 Greatest Hits, Vol. 1 (2001, Bompastor/Word – Brazilian release)
 Still Means War (2002, Word Records)
 The Power Of Praise (2003, Word Records)
 The Praise Collection (2006, Word Records)
 The Ultimate Collection (2006, Star Song Records)
 The Early Years (2006, Star Song Records – new artwork)
 The Definitive Collection (2007, Word Records)
 Best of the 80s (2012, Star Song Records)
 40th Anniversary (2013, Star Song Records)

Charting singles

Solo projects
There are several solo projects by members of Petra, namely those of Greg X. Volz (lead vocals, 1977–1985), John Lawry (keyboards & vocals, 1985–1995), and John Schlitt (lead vocals, 1986–2005, 2010–present). John Elefante, co-producer of Petra, also brought out a few albums. Both he and his brother Dino, co-producer of Petra, founded the group Mastedon and have produced several other bands together.

Also released in March 2007 was a duet project by John Schlitt and Bob Hartman entitled Vertical Expressions, under the band name II Guys From Petra.

See also
 Bob Hartman – founder of Petra
 II Guys from Petra

References

External links
 The Official Petra Website.
 Albums Page in PRMW.com
 Petraspective: full Petra discography, including track lists, credits, lyrics, chords; also info on guest appearances and solo efforts of former band-members.

Discography
Christian music discographies